The men's singles was one of four events of the 1913 World Hard Court Championships tennis tournament held in Paris, France from 7 June until 15 June 1913. The draw consisted of 32 players. Otto Froitzheim was the title holder but lost in the semifinals to André Gobert.

Draw

Finals

Top half

Bottom half

References

Men's Singles